Lucius Septimius Nestor also known as Nestor of Laranda (Νέστωρ Λαρανδεύς), was a Greek poet who lived during the late-second and early-third centuries AD. 
According to Strabo and Stephanus Byzantinus he was from the Laranda in Lycaonia, while according to Suda from the Laranda in Lycia.

He composed learned poetry on a variety of subjects in the tradition of Hellenistic poets like Nicander and Parthenius of Nicaea, but his magnum opus was perhaps the lipogrammatic Iliad, a work which would have been a showpiece for his poetic virtuosity and knowledge of Homeric scholarship. Although his fame was great during his lifetime, little survives of Nestor's poetry today, but its influence may be recognized in Nonnus' Dionysiaca, which appears also to have drawn upon the work of Nestor's son Peisander.

Works
The Suda attributes two poems to Nestor by name, a lipogrammatic Iliad (Iliàs leipográmmatos) and a Metamorphoses, and notes that Nestor also wrote other poems. Several verbatim fragments of the Metamorphoses are transmitted in the Greek Anthology. No fragments of the Ilias leipogrammatos survive, but the poem will have concerned the Trojan War much like Homer's Iliad, with at least one notable difference: the letter denoting each book's number would not have been used in its text; the first book, for example, would not include the letter alpha which was used to denote the numeral 1. 

Two works of medical didactic poetry are also attested for Nestor by the Geoponica: the Alexicepus (Alexíkēpos), or Garden of Defence, and 
Panacea (Panákeia). The Alexicepus will have belonged to the tradition of Nicander's Alexipharmaca.

An Alexandreiad (Alexandreiás), meaning "On the deeds of Alexander", attributed to a "Nestor" by Stephanus of Byzantium, who cited the poem for toponyms, was probably the work of this poet. If so, the poem might have been composed in honor of Alexander Severus, though Jacoby thought the Alexander of the title to be Alexander the Great.

Notes

Bibliography
 .
 .
 .
 .
 .
 .
 .
 .

4th-century Greek writers
Ancient Roman poets
3rd-century poets
Ancient Greek epic poets
Lycaonia
People from Karaman